Heringia canadensis , the Canadian smoothleg, is a fairly common species of syrphid fly observed in many parts of North America. Hoverflies can remain nearly motionless in flight. The  adults are also  known as flower flies for they are commonly found on flowers from which they get both energy-giving nectar and protein-rich pollen. Larvae when known are aphid predators.

References

Diptera of North America
Hoverflies of North America
Pipizinae
Insects described in 1921
Taxa named by Charles Howard Curran